Natas may refer to:

Natas (comics), a DC Comics master martial artist
Natas (computer virus), a computer virus written by James Gentile
Natas (group), a Detroit hip hop group consisting of Esham, Mastamind and T-N-T
Natas Kaupas, American professional skateboarder
Los Natas, an Argentine rock band
National Academy of Television Arts and Sciences
Akkineni Nageswara Rao, a veteran Indian Telugu film actor; sometimes nicknamed Natasamrat
King Natas, the villain of the Dungeon Explorer video games

See also
Nata (disambiguation)